Gul Makai is a 2020 Indian biographical dramadirected by H.E. Amjad Khan  and written by Bhaswati Chakrabarty, Produced under the banner of Tekno Films and Pen Studios. The film was shot in Hindi and Urdu. The film is based on the life of a Pakistani activist for female education and the youngest Nobel Prize laureate, Malala Yousafzai. Debutante Reem Shaikh played role of Malala. The film also features the late Om Puri in his final acting role, Divya Dutta, Atul Kulkarni, Mukesh Rishi and Pankaj Tripathi. The film was released on 31 January 2020.

Plot 
Gul Makai accounts the courageous journey and struggle of 2014 Nobel Peace Prize winner Malala Yousafzai, starting from her humble upbringing in the Swat Valley in northwestern Pakistan to her becoming the champion for free education to all women. When Swat Valley was seized by Taliban gunmen in 2009, Malala spoke out for the rights of girls, especially the right to receive a complete education. She started blogging on the BBC Urdu website under the pseudonym Gul Makai, against the oppression faced by them in the Swat Valley. As she continued her activism, gaining worldwide recognition and support, she was hunted down and shot by a Taliban gunman as part of the organization's violent opposition to girls' education.

Cast 
 Reem Shaikh as Malala Yousafzai
 Atul Kulkarni as Ziauddin Yousafzai
 Divya Dutta as Toor Pekai Yousafzai
 Om Puri as General Ashfaq Parvez Kayani
 Arif Zakaria as Sufi Muhammad
 Mukesh Rishi as Maulana Fazlullah
 Abhimanyu Singh as Hakimullah Mehsud
 Pankaj Tripathi as Baitullah Mehsud
 Sharib Hashmi as Ataullah Khan
 Kamlesh Gill as Malala's grandmother
 Chandrashekhar Dutta as Muslim Khan
 Ajay Chourey as Musa Khankhel
 Sayyed Irshad Ali Khan as Capt. Najam Riaz Raja
 Ganesh Yadav	as Gen. Sanaullah Khan

Production 
H.E. Amjad Khan, who is a Permanent Intergovernmental Observer to the United Nations Economic and Social Council, also Goodwill Ambassador IIMSAM-UN-ECOSOC, decided to make a film on Malala's life and struggle in 2012, right after the assassination attempt on her by Taliban gunmen. He announced the film in late 2012. Then writer Bhaswati Chakrabarty, spent the next 4 years researching and writing the script.

To cast the right girl for the role of Malala, several hundred actresses were auditioned. Finally, the director announced a newcomer for the role, 16-year-old Bangladeshi student from Dhaka named Fatima Sheikh. Although no photographs showing Fatima Sheikh’s face or other details about her were released to ensure her safety and security, her identity got leaked. Her family started receiving threats from religious extremists, who also threw stones at their house in Dhaka. Fatima Sheikh's family decided to back out due to the pressure. The search for Malala continued and finally Indian television child actress Reem Shaikh was cast for the role of Malala. Veteran Bollywood actors like Om Puri, Divya Dutta, Mukesh Rishi and Arif Zakaria were cast in other important roles. According to the director, physical resemblance with the real-life person was given special consideration while casting all of the characters.

The film went into production in late 2016. The first schedule of the film was filmed at locations in Bhuj (Gujarat) and Mumbai. The 2nd schedule of the film which was to be shot in Kashmir was deferred due to the strained circumstances there. As the conditions got back to normal in Kashmir, the shoot resumed in January 2018 amidst tight security in Ganderbal district of Jammu and Kashmir. The shooting wrapped up by end of January 2018 and the film has been in post-production since then. The film has been edited by the National Award-winning editor, Praveen Angre. The film has gone through extensive VFX work to re-create Swat Valley landscape and war scenes between the Taliban and Pakistani Army.

Soundtrack 

The background score for the film has been composed by Amar Mohile. The title song was written by Bhaswati Chakrabarty and the remaining songs were written and composed by H.E. Amjad Khan.

References

External links
 
 
 

Indian biographical drama films
Films set in Khyber Pakhtunkhwa
Malala Yousafzai
2020 films
2020s Hindi-language films
Military of Pakistan in films
Films about terrorism in Asia
Insurgency in Khyber Pakhtunkhwa fiction
Films about Nobel laureates
Films shot in Jammu and Kashmir
Films shot in Gujarat
Films shot in Mumbai
Works about the Taliban
Tehrik-i-Taliban Pakistan
War in Afghanistan (2001–2021) films